A silsesquioxane is an organosilicon compound with the chemical formula [RSiO3/2]n  (R = H, alkyl, aryl, alkenyl or alkoxyl.). Silsesquioxanes are colorless solids that adopt cage-like or polymeric structures with Si-O-Si linkages and tetrahedral Si vertices.  Silsesquioxanes are members of polyoctahedral silsesquioxanes ("POSS"), which have attracted attention as preceramic polymer precursors to ceramic materials and nanocomposites. Diverse substituents (R) can be attached to the Si centers.  The molecules are unusual because they feature an inorganic silicate core and an organic exterior.  The silica core confers rigidity and thermal stability.

Structure
Silsesquioxanes are known in molecular form with 6, 8, 10, and 12 Si vertices, as well as polymers. The cages are sometimes labeled T6 T8, T10, and T12, respectively (T = tetrahedral vertex). The T8 cages, the most widely studied members, have the formula [RSiO3/2]8, or equivalently R8Si8O12. In all cases each Si center is bonded to three oxo groups, which in turn connect to other Si centers.  The fourth group on Si is usually an alkyl, halide, hydride, alkoxide, etc. In the cubic clusters with Oh  symmetry the Si-O-Si angles are in the range 145–152°, being bowed out, allowing the Si centers to better adopt tetrahedral geometry. The O-Si-O angle are in the range: 107–112°, Si-O bond: 1.55–1.65 Å.

Synthesis 
Silsesquioxanes are usually synthesized by hydrolysis of organotrichlorosilanes.  An idealized synthesis is:
8 RSiCl3  +  12 H2O   →   [RSiO3/2]8  +  24 HCl

The formation of HCl negatively impacts the relative rates of hydrolysis and condensation of intermediate silanols. Consequently, silsesquioxanes can be obtained directly by condensation of the corresponding silanetriols which occurs at neutral pH and works even for sterically very bulky substituents.

8 RSi(OH)3    →   [RSiO3/2]8  +  12 H2O

Depending on the R substituent, the exterior of cage can be further modified. When R = H, the Si-H group can undergo hydrosilylation or oxidation to the silanol. Bridged polysilsesquioxanes are most readily prepared from clusters that contain two or more trifunctional silyl groups attached to non-hydrolysable silicon-carbon bonds, with typical sol-gel processing. Vinyl-substituted silsesquioxanes can be linked by the alkene metathesis.

Reactivity

Cage-Rearrangement 
Reorganization of the siloxane
cage-like core (T8 → T10) can be performed, including
isolation of intermediates, and cage rearrangement achieved by using Bronsted
superacid, trifluoromethanesulfonic acid (CF3SO3H). In this case, reaction of hexahedral silsesquioxane and CF3SO3H in DMSO conducted in 1 : 12 molar ratio gives heptahedral silsesquioxane. In the first step CF3SO3H acid attacks siloxane Si-O-Si bonds and the formation of Si-O-SO2CF3 bond parallel with cage opening process is observed and compound B is obtained (Figure below). Such an inversion is observed at silicon atom during nucleophilic displacement reaction that is usually noticed when leaving groups are replaced by soft nucleophiles. Uponfurther acid attack, both T6(OH)4 C and siloxane dimer D are formed. Because this reaction takes place in an aqueous conditions, compound E of general formula T8(OH)4 as a consequence of hydrolysis reaction was obtained. E is prone to reaction with D
and due to this, the abstraction of CF3SO anion occurs and the closure frame with the spontaneous cage-rearrangement to heptahedral T10 structure F is observed. Although, heptahedral F is less favorable energetically (MM2 data), in this case its creation is forces by the formation of a new Si4O4 moiety from much more less stable substrates D and E.

Polymeric silsesquioxanes
Polymeric silsesquioxanes have been reported, first by Brown. High molecular weight tractable polymeric phenyl silsesquioxane featured a ladder-type structure. Brown's findings were the basis for many future investigations. Brown's synthesis proceeded in three-steps:
(1) the hydrolysis of phenyltrichlorosilane, 
(2) equilibration of this hydrolyzate with potassium hydroxide at a low concentration and temperature to give the prepolymer, and 
(3) equilibration of the prepolymer at a high concentration and temperature to give the final polymer. 
Other notable silsesquioxane polymers include the soluble polymethylsilsesquioxane with high molecular weights described by Japan Synthetic Rubber. This polymer which, unlike its phenyl derivative, gels easily during the course of its synthesis, has found applications in cosmetics, resins, and lithography. Hierarchical organic-inorganic (hybrid) polysilsesquioxane (PSQ) materials using polyhedral oligomeric silsesquioxanes (POSS) cages as singular building blocks of the inorganic framework were synthesized by different research groups, exhibiting high specific surface area and hydrothermal stability and micro and/or mesoporosity. In addition, Marchesi et al. developed a series of amorphous POSS-based polysilsesquioxanes, in which the POSS cages (of partially-condensed T7 or anionic completely-condensed T8-POSS) act as structural units of the polymeric-like inorganic network, both alone or in conjunction with metal ions of the lanthanide series (europium and terbium, especially).

Hydridosilsesquioxanes
A well known hydrogen silsesquioxane is [HSiO3/2]8. Early syntheses involved treatment (protonation) of trichlorosilane with concentrated sulfuric acid, and fuming sulfuric acid, affording T10-T16 oligomers. The T8 cluster was also synthesized by the reaction of trimethylsilane with a mixture of acetic acid, cyclohexane, and hydrochloric acid.  The Si-H groups are amenable to hydrosilylation.

Potential applications

Electronic materials
Films of organosilsesquioxane, e.g., poly(methylsilsesquioxane), have been examined for semiconducting devices. Poly(hydridosilsesquioxane), which has a linked-cage structure, was sold under the name Fox Flowable Oxide.

Methylsilsesquioxanes have been examined for spin-on-glass (SOG) dielectrics. Bridged silsesquioxanes have been used for quantum confined nano-size semiconductors. Silsesquioxane resins have also been used for these applications because they have high dielectric strengths, low dielectric constants, high volume resistivities, and low dissipation factors, making them very suitable for electronics applications. These resins have heat and fire resistant properties, which can be used to make fiber-reinforced composites for electrical laminates.

Polyhedral oligomeric silsesquioxanes have been examined as a means to give improved mechanical properties and stability, with an organic matrix for good optical and electrical properties. The mechanisms of degradation in these devices is not well understood, but it is believed that material defect understanding is important for understanding the optical and electronic properties.

Hydridosilsesquioxanes can be converted to silica coatings for potential application in integrated circuits.

LEDs
For potential applications to light emitting diodes, cubic silsesquioxanes. have been functionalized.  One of the first precursors used in light emitting application was octadimethylsiloxysilsesquioxane, which can be prepared in yields of >90% by treating tetraethoxysilane or rice hull ash with tetramethylammonium hydroxide followed by dimethylchlorosilane.   The general method of hydrolyzing organotrichlorosilanes is still effective here. When brominated or aminated, these structures can be coupled with epoxies, aldehydes, and bromoaromatics, which enable attachment of these silsesquioxanes to π-conjugated polymers.  These methods can use copolymerization techniques, Grignard reagents, and different coupling strategies. There has also been research on the ability of conjugated dendrimer silsesquioxanes to behave as light emitting materials. Though, highly branched substituents tend to have π-π interactions, which hinder high luminescent quantum yield.

Sensors
For chemosensor applications, silsesquioxane cages conjugated with fluorescent molecules can be directly used to detect fluoride ions under a cage-encapsulation showing a change of color under naked eyes  and other anions.

Antimicrobial silsesquioxanes
Silsesquioxanes have been functionalized with biocidal quaternary ammonium (QASs) groups to produce antimicrobial coatings. QASs are disinfectants, antiseptics, and antifoulants that kill bacteria, fungi, and algae. The relatively small size of the silsesquioxane molecule, 2-5 nm, allows a QAS functionalized molecule to have a charge density similar to dendrimers and thus the antimicrobial efficacy is prominent.  Dimethyl-n-octylamine was quaternized by octa(3-chloropropylsilsesquioxane), (T-ClPr)8.  The resulting material exhibited antimicrobial efficacy for the prevention of growth of both Gram-positive and Gram-negative bacteria.
 
Array of QAS functionalized polyhedral oligomeric silsesquioxanes (Q-POSS) have been reported.  These researchers varied the alkyl chain length from –C12H25 to –C18H37 and varied the counter ion between chloride, bromide, and iodine.  The first reaction was the hydrosilylation between allydimethlamine and octasilane polyhedral oligomeric silsesquioxane via Karstedt's catalyst to make a tertiaryamino-functinoalized silsesquioxane. The second step was the quaternization of the tertiaryamino groups with an alkyl halide. The alkyl halides used were 1-iodooctadecane, 1-bromohexadecane, and 1-chloroctadecane.

The silsesquioxane core in these hybrid materials provides an increased glass transition temperature, improved mechanical properties, higher use temperature, and lower flammability. These desirable properties combined with the ability to readily functionalize a silsesquioxane with multiple antimicrobial groups allows for robust biocides with higher charge densities while maintaining a compact molecular structure. The organic functionalities provide high compatibility with polymers allowing for easy incorporation into many mediums. Of particular interest are silicone paints and coatings used in hospitals. Typical biocidal ammonium functionalized polymers are incompatible, but silsesquioxanes closely mimic the silicone structure. A silicone-based paint combined with QAS-functionalized silsesquioxanes could be used to paint medical and sanitary devices, biomedical devices, exam equipment, medical storage rooms, hospital rooms, clinics, doctor offices, etc. to prevent the formation and spread of bacteria. For example, the Q-POSS developed  was combined with polydimethylsiloxane and catalysis to form a crosslinked network. The researchers found that coatings based on bromide and chloride had the best antimicrobial efficacy.

Partially condensed silsesquioxanes: Si7 species
A well studied example of a partially condensed silsesquioxanes is the trisilanol Cy7Si7O9(OH)3, prepared by the slow (months) hydrolysis of trichlorocyclohexylsilane (C6H11SiCl3). The same cage can be prepared by acid-mediated cleavage of fully condensed silsesquioxane.  This process results in silanediols that can further be used to create new metallasilsesquioxanes.  These partially condensed silsesquioxanes are intermediates en route to the fully condensed cages.

In general, such silsesquioxane trisilanols form discrete dimers in the solid held together by cooperatively enhanced cyclic hydrogen bonded networks. These dimers are retained in solution and a dynamic equilibrium has been elucidated using NMR.

Other partially condensed silsesquioxanes
Other partially condensed species adopt ladder structures wherein in which two long chains composed of RSiO3/2 units are connected at regular intervals by Si-O-Si bonds.   Amorphous structures include  RSiO3/2 unit connections without any organized structure formation.

Metal complexes of partially condensed silsesquioxanes and metal-containing POSS
The incompletely condensed silsesquioxanes bind numerous metals, including Na+, Li+, and Be2+ as well as transition metals.  Cubic metal-silsesquioxane derivatives of the core stoichiometry MSi7O12 can be prepared by treating the incomplete cage with a metal halide in the presence of a base such as triethylamine.  Another route of synthesis involves first deprotonating the trisilanol group using LiN(SiMe3)2.  Aspinall et al. later succeeded in doing the same using three equivalents of n-BuLi in hexanes and further results indicate that alkali metal derivatives of deprotonated silsesquioxanes could also be prepared using alkali metalbis(trimethylsilyl) amides. Marchesi et. al synthesised a luminescent fully-condensed rare-earth-doped POSS bearing in the structure the europium ion by reaction of the open-corner heptaisobutyl trisilanol T7-POSS ((C4H9)7Si7O9(OH)3) with anhydrous EuCl3 under basic conditions. Furthermore, a combination of partially-condensed tetrasilanolphenyl POSS with terbium acetate and/or europium acetate (in the case of the mixture, at different molar ratio) led to novel double-decker silsesquioxane (DDSQ) materials consisting of POSS bricks and with intrinsic luminescent properties, in which the lanthanide ions act as both structural and functional agents in the structure.

Catalytic properties
Although lacking commercial applications, metallasilsesquioxanes have been investigated as catalysts.  The coordination environment provided by Cy7Si7O9(OH)3 has been proposed to approximate β-tridymite and β-cristobalite.  Some of these complexes are active as catalysts for alkene metathesis, polymerization, epoxidation and Diels-Alder reactions of enones, as well as other Lewis acid-catalyzed reactions like Oppenauer oxidation and Meerwein-Pondorf-Verley reductions.
. A number of metallasilsesquioxanes have been reported that can polymerize ethene, akin to the Phillips catalyst. The catalyst can be easily activated with trimethylaluminum and typically proceeds with high turnover number. Vanadium complexes as well as Ziegler–Natta type catalysts also catalyze the polymerization of ethylene. The coordination of metals  to the silsesquioxane framework gives electrophilic centers that are approximately as electron-withdrawing as a trifluoromethyl group, leading to increased catalytic activity.

References

Organosilicon compounds
Oxygen compounds